Wild Animal Initiative (WAI) is a nonprofit organization focused on supporting and producing academic research on improving wild animal welfare. It is one of three "Top Charities" recommended by Animal Charity Evaluators.

History 
WAI was founded in 2019, as a merger of the organizations Utility Farm (founded in 2016 by Abraham Rowe) and Wild-Animal Suffering Research (founded in 2017 by Persis Eskander). Its stated mission is to "understand and improve the lives of wild animals," by studying natural causes of pain and death for animals, such as natural disasters, disease, and starvation.

Abraham Rowe was the Executive Director of WAI until 2019, after which Mal Graham became the leader of the organization. In 2022, Graham took the role of Strategy Director, and Cameron Meyer Shorb became the Executive Director.

In 2021, WAI received a grant of $3,500,000 from Open Philanthropy to support research on wild animal welfare. In the same year, WAI launched a research fund for high-impact wild animal welfare research, with the intent to "distribute over $3 million to academic research projects designed to understand and improve the lives of wild animals".

Reception 
Animal Charity Evaluators, which rates the cost-effectiveness of projects that work on improving animal welfare, rated WAI as a "Top Charity" in 2020, meaning that in their view, donating to WAI was one of the most effective ways to help animals. WAI is the only group not working on farmed animal welfare to ever receive that rating. WAI retained its "Top Charity" status in 2021 and 2022.

See also 
 Animal Ethics (organization)

References

Further reading

External links 
 
 November 2021 review by Animal Charity Evaluators
 Wild Animal Initiative's Wildness podcast
 Wild-Animal Suffering Research
 Utility Farm

2019 establishments in Minnesota
501(c)(3) organizations
Animal welfare organizations based in the United States
Non-profit organizations based in Minnesota
Organizations established in 2019
Organizations associated with effective altruism
Wild animal suffering